The Bland Mayfly was an early aircraft constructed  in 1910 by Lilian E. Bland in Carnmoney in Ireland.  It is credited as the first aeroplane to be designed and constructed by a woman.

Background
Lillian E. Bland was a sports journalist and photographer.  While taking  a series of colour photographs of birds on an island off the west coast of Scotland in 1909, she received a postcard bearing an illustration of the Blériot XI aircraft.  Already excited by the soaring flight of the gulls she was photographing, she was inspired by the postcard to attempt to construct her own aircraft.

Design and development

Lillian Bland started construction of the Mayfly in the stables of her home during 1909, after making a series of tests with large-scale model gliders.  The Mayfly was an equal-span biplane resembling the Farman III in general layout, with a front-mounted elevator and a rear-mounted empennage carried on booms.

The full size aircraft was first flown as a glider from Carnmoney Hill early in 1910, initially unmanned. and with an undercarriage consisting of a pair of skids.  These tests being successful, modifications were made to enable an engine to be fitted, and at the same time ailerons were fitted on the rear interplane struts.  Bland collected the  Avro engine from the Avro works in Manchester in mid 1910.  When first fitted she had not received the petrol tank, and initial ground trials were conducted by feeding petrol from a whisky bottle via her aunt's ear-trumpet, the only tubing to hand. Trials of the powered aircraft took place at the Deerpark in Randalstown.
  
The  completed Mayfly was a small pusher configuration equal span biplane. Ash was used for the wing spars and the skids, spruce for the ribs and interplane struts, bamboo for the booms carrying the elevator and tail surfaces and the engine mounting was American Elm.  The wings were covered in unbleached calico, which was laced to the wing structure, allowing it to be tightened when it stretched.   It was powered by a  air-cooled horizontally-opposed two-cylinder engine made by Avro, who also supplied the propeller and various metal fittings used.  The forward- mounted elevator was divided into two halves and carried on three pairs of  converging booms: behind the wings two paired booms carried  a small rectangular fixed tailplane with an elevator either side, and a small fin and rudder. The undercarriage consisted of a pair of long skids bearing a pair of unsprung wheels upon which the aircraft rested: in front of these was a large nosewheel.

Miss Bland wrote a detailed account of the Mayfly for Flight, where she estimates her expenses as totalling less than £200, despite extensive rebuilding and having to replace the propeller, broken when a wire snapped. The power installation was responsible for most of her expenses: only £3-4 was estimated as being necessary for wood, and around £6 for the wheels.

The powered aircraft was first flown in August 1910, and was successfully used by Bland until early in 1911, when her father, concerned about her safety, offered to buy her a car if she gave up flying. In 2017, Sinead Morrisey recounts one of Bland's flights in her poem The Mayfly.

Realising that the aircraft was underpowered and too frail to accept a larger engine, and having made her point that aeronautics was not a male preserve, she accepted the bribe.  The engine was sold and the airframe given to a boy's club for use as a glider.

Glengormley Park in Newtonabbey was renamed Lillian Bland Community Park in August 2011; at the same time a stainless-steel sculpture of the Mayfly was unveiled.

Specifications

Notes

References

Sources

Aircraft manufactured in the United Kingdom
Biplanes
Single-engined pusher aircraft
1910s British civil aircraft
Aircraft first flown in 1910